The 2010–11 Xavier Musketeers men's basketball team represented Xavier University in the 2010–11 college basketball season. This was head coach Chris Mack's second season at Xavier. The Musketeers competed in the Atlantic 10 Conference and played their home games at the Cintas Center. They finished the season 24–8, 15–1 in A-10 play to win the regular season conference championship. The Musketeers lost in the quarterfinals of the A-10 tournament to Dayton. They received an at-large bid in the NCAA tournament as a #6 seed where they lost in the second round to Marquette.

Previous season
The Musketeers finished the 2009–10 season 26–9, 14–2 in A-10 play to win a share of the regular season championship. They lost in the semifinals of the A-10 tournament to Richmond. The Musketeers received an at-large bid as a #6 seed to the NCAA tournament where they defeated Minnesota and Pittsburgh before losing to Kansas State in the Sweet Sixteen.

Preseason
This was head coach Chris Mack's second season at Xavier. On October 21, 2010, the Musketeers were picked by other Atlantic 10 coaches to finish second in the league standings and received three first place votes. Tu Holloway was named to the All-Conference Second Team, while Dante Jackson was named to the defensive team. Jay Bilas of ESPN named Xavier the top team in the Atlantic 10, and praised the coaching job Chris Mack did in his initial season.

Roster
Source

Schedule
 
|-
!colspan=9 style=| Exhibition

|-
!colspan=9 style=| Regular season

|-
!colspan=9 style=| Atlantic 10 tournament

|-
!colspan=9 style=| NCAA tournament

Season

Preconference season
Tu Holloway had a triple-double as Xavier defeated Wake Forest 83–75 in the Skip Prosser Classic. Playing with a cut above his eyebrow, Holloway scored 12 points, dished a career-high 14 assists and grabbed a career-high 14 rebounds. David West was the last Xavier player to record a triple-double when he had one against Long Island University on December 8, 2001. Xavier started the game on a 12–2 run and forced Wake Forest into six turnovers in the first five minutes. The Musketeers led the entire game, and Kenny Frease scored a career-high 22 points.

The annual Crosstown Shootout was held on January 6, 2011, pitting the Musketeers against archrival Cincinnati. In what was Xavier's lowest-scoring game in seven years, the Musketeers lost in convincing fashion 66–46. The Bearcats, meanwhile, improved to 15–0, equalling their second best start. Xavier hit one shot from beyond the arc on ten attempts. The Musketeers were led by Jamel McLean's 18 points, while Tu Holloway was held to five, well below his season average.

Awards & honors
Tu Holloway
Preseason All-Atlantic 10 Second Team
Bob Cousy Award Watchlist
November 15, 2010 Atlantic 10 Conference Player of the Week
November 22, 2010 Atlantic 10 Conference Player of the Week
December 20, 2010 Atlantic 10 Conference Player of the Week
January 24, 2011 Atlantic 10 Conference Player of the Week

Dante Jackson
Preseason All-Atlantic 10 Defensive Team

References

Xavier
Xavier Musketeers men's basketball seasons
Xavier